Let's Ride may refer to:

Let's Ride (album), an album by Montell Jordan
"Let's Ride" (Montell Jordan song), the title song
"Let's Ride" (The Game song)
"Let's Ride" (Choclair song)
"Let's Ride" (Kid Rock song), a song from the 2012 album, Rebel Soul
"Let's Ride" (Richie Rich song)
"Let's Ride", a song by Airbourne from Runnin' Wild
"Let's Ride", a song by Chingy from Hoodstar
"Let's Ride", a song by Status Quo from Rockin' All Over the World
Let's Ride (Denver Broncos Catchphrase), a catchphrase coined by Russell Wilson